Shulha is a gender-neutral Ukrainian surname. Notable people with the surname include:

 Veronika Shulha (born 1981), Ukrainian football goalkeeper
 Yuriy Shulha (born 1966), Ukrainian speed skater

See also
 
 Shulga

Ukrainian-language surnames